Royal New Zealand College  may refer to:

 Royal New Zealand College of General Practitioners
 Royal New Zealand Police College
 Royal New Zealand Naval College

See also

 
 
 Royal Australian and New Zealand College (disambiguation)
 Royal College (disambiguation)